Prism is the debut album by Canadian rock band Prism, released in May 1977 on the Canadian record label GRT. It was produced primarily by Bruce Fairbairn, and the majority of songs were written by Jim Vallance (who also served as co-producer on three tracks). It achieved platinum status in Canada (in excess of 100,000 units sold). Prism peaked at #137 on the Billboard 200 in November 1977.

"Spaceship Superstar" became the band's signature song and a staple of Canadian rock radio. Record producer Bruce Fairbairn and songwriter Jim Vallance both went on to achieve huge international success.

Track listing
All songs written by Jim Vallance under the pseudonym Rodney Higgs, unless otherwise noted.

 "Spaceship Superstar" – 4:06
 "Open Soul Surgery" (R. Higgs, Hillary Knight) – 3:51 
 "It's Over" – 4:06
 "Take Me to the Kaptin" – 3:59
 "Vladivostok" – 5:08
 "Amelia" – 3:14
 "Freewill" (Tom Lavin) – 3:04
 "Julie" – 3:21
 "I Ain't Lookin' Anymore" (Lindsay Mitchell) – 3:28

Personnel
Prism
 Lindsay Mitchell – vocals, guitar
 Ron Tabak – vocals
 John Hall – keyboards
 Ab Bryant – bass
 Rodney Higgs  – drums, keyboards, producer
 Tom Lavin – guitar, vocals

Prism Hornsection
 Bruce Fairbairn – horn, producer
 Tom Keenlyside – horn

Cover versions
 The song "Open Soul Surgery" was covered by April Wine in their 1986 album Walking Through Fire, as well as Ian Lloyd's 1979 album “Goose Bumps”.
 The song "Take Me to the Kaptin" was covered by Parallel 49 and released as a single in June 2020.

References

External links
 Prism Official website
 

Prism (band) albums
1977 debut albums
Albums produced by Bruce Fairbairn